Joaquim Clotet Martí (Mataró, Spain, March 16, 1946) holds a doctorate in Philosophy and Letters, with outstanding work in the area of Ethics and Bioethics. Since 2004, he has been the President of the Pontifícia Universidade Católica do Rio Grande do Sul (PUCRS), Porto Alegre, Brazil.

Biography and academic background

Born in the city of Mataró, a province of Barcelona in Spain, Joaquim Clotet graduated with a degree in English and Philosophy and Letters (1972) from the University of Barcelona (Spain), obtaining a doctorate in Philosophy and Letters from the same institution (1980).

After his doctorate, he completed studies and research at the Gregorian University of Rome (Italy), the University of London (United Kingdom), Georgetown University (Washington D.C., USA), the University of Ottawa (Canada), Oxford University (United Kingdom) and the University of Warwick (Coventry, United Kingdom).

After teaching for nine years in the Faculty of Philosophy at the University of Barcelona, he moved to Porto Alegre in 1984, when he became a full professor at PUCRS. He also taught at UFRGS in the Graduate Program in Medicine – Medical Practice – in 1995 and 1996.

From 1994 to 2004, he was the Senior Vice President of PUCRS, assuming the Presidency in December 2004. He was reappointed in 2008 and 2012. His administration has been highlighted by the increase of internationalization in all academic areas, and the incentive for research, entrepreneurship and innovation. In addition to being President, Clotet is Full Professor of Bioethics in the Master's and Doctorate Programs of Medicine and Dentistry. He is a Visiting Professor at the University of Santiago de Compostela (Spain), the University of San Marcos (Peru), the National University of La Plata (Argentina) and the University of Buenos Aires (Argentina).

He was a member of the National Committee on Access and Use of the Human Genome, by the Ministry of Health, the National Committee for Ethics in Research, by the Ministry of Health (1997-2001) and President of the Riograndense Society of Bioethics (1999-2001).

He was also a member of the Hume Society, the Kennedy Institute of Ethics (USA), the Iberoamerican Society for Utilitarian Studies (Spain), the Hastings Center (USA) and the American Society of Law, Medicine and Ethics (USA).

Visiting Fellow, Exeter College, University of Oxford, 2017.

Publications

 Bioética: uma visão panorâmica (Bioethics: an overview)
   Porto Alegre,Brazil,Edipucrs,2005
 Bioética: uma aproximação(Bioethics: an approximation)
    Porto Alegre,Brazil,Edipucrs,2003
 Uma introdução à Bioética (An Introduction to Bioethics)
    Porto Alegre,Brazil,Nestlé,2002-contributor
 Bioética(Bioethics)
    Porto Alegre,Brazil,Edipucrs,2001-editor
 Sobre Bioética e Robert M. Veatch: textos(On bioethics and Robert M. Veatch: papers)
    Porto Alegre,Brazil,Edipucrs,2001-editor
 Consentimento informado e a sua prática na assistência e na pesquisa no Brasil(Informed consent and its practice in assistance and research in Brazil)
    Porto Alegre,Brazil,Edipucrs,2000-contributor
 A justiça: abordagens filosóficas(Justice: philosophical approaches)
    Porto Alegre,Brazil,PUCRS-Editora Acadêmica,1988-editor
 Los 60 Conceptos Claves de la Antropología Cultural(The 60 Key Concepts of Cultural Anthropology)
    Barcelona,Spain,Daimon,1982-contributor
 G.E.Moore: Principhia Ethica
    Barcelona,Spain,Editorial Laia,1982-editor, introduction and comments
 Guía Didáctica Filosofía 3 BUP(Philosophy Coursebook 3 – High School)
    Zaragoza,Spain,Edelvives,1978-contributor
 Filosofía 3 BUP(Philosophy 3 – High School)
    Zaragoza,Spain,1977-contributor

Clotet has also published a variety of articles in national and international scientific journals.

Awards received

2013
 Doctor Honoris Causa - Dalhousie University

2012
 Luiz de Miranda Poet Award, given by the Royal Academy of Letters – Order of the Brotherhood of Poets – Brazil
 Eastern Troops Award, in the Personality Category, given by the Military Police - Command of Policing the Capital – 19th Battalion of the Military Police

2009
 Brother Afonso Medal, awarded by PUCRS

2008
 Diploma from the Order of the Knights of Osório, Brazilian Military – Southern Military Command, Cavalry Guard's 3rd Regiment

2007
 Honorary Title of Citizen of Porto Alegre, City Hall of Porto Alegre, Law Nº 10.243, August 29, 2007

1972
 Beca-Prêmio (Academic Distinction and Grant awarded to the most outstanding student), School of Modern Languages at the University of Barcelona

References

1946 births
Living people
Bioethicists
21st-century Spanish philosophers
20th-century Spanish philosophers
Academic staff of the University of Barcelona
University of Barcelona alumni